is a lighthouse located on the island of Sugashima, in Ise Bay off the shores of the city of Toba, Mie Prefecture, Japan. It is located within the borders of the Ise-Shima National Park.

History 

The Sugashima Lighthouse was designed and constructed by British engineer Richard Henry Brunton, and was first lit on July 1, 1873, in a ceremony attended by Saigō Takamori and other dignitaries of the Meiji government. Brunton constructed a total of 25 lighthouses in Japan from far northern Hokkaidō to southern Kyūshū during his career in Japan, each with a different design. Built of domestically produced white bricks, the Sugashima Lighthouse is styled in the manner of a European castle round tower, complete with crenellations. It replaced a more primitive light established by the Tokugawa shogunate on the island in 1673 in response to numerous shipwrecks in the area.

The lighthouse was fully automated and has been unattended since July 1959. The 9.7 meter tall tower contains a fourth order Fresnel lens, and has a range of 27 kilometers.

The Sugashima Lighthouse is listed as one of the “50 Lighthouses of Japan” by the Japan Lighthouse Association. It is operated by the Japan Coast Guard.

Protected status 
In 1964, the former official abode of the lighthouse keeper was relocated to serve as an exhibit at Meiji Mura, a historical museum in Inuyama, Aichi and was registered as an Important Cultural Property of Japan in 1968. The lighthouse itself became a Registered Tangible Cultural Property of Japan in 2010.

See also 

 List of lighthouses in Japan

Notes

References 
Brunton, Richard. Building Japan, 1868–1879. Japan Library, 1991. 
Pedlar, Neil. The Imported Pioneers: Westerners who Helped Build Modern Japan. Routledge, 1990.

External links 

Lighthouses in Japan 
Japan Coast Guard 
Museum Meiji Mura 
Historic Lighthouses of Japan

Lighthouses completed in 1873
Buildings and structures in Mie Prefecture
Lighthouses in Japan
Tourist attractions in Mie Prefecture